Ranger Uranium Environmental Inquiry (RUEI) (also known as the Fox Report)  was a committee established by the Whitlam Government in Australia, which sought to explore the environmental concerns surrounding uranium mining.

Report

According to the National Archives of Australia:
The Inquiry found that if uranium mining was properly regulated and controlled, its hazards were not sufficient to prevent the development of the mines. The Inquiry recommended the establishment of a comprehensive system of environmental monitoring and research, overseen by a coordinating committee representing all the agencies involved, and chaired by a supervising scientist. It also recommended the granting of Aboriginal title to a substantial part of the region and the creation of a national park.

References

1976 in Australia
Uranium mining in Australia
Uranium politics

National parks of Australia